Aluchehluy-e Olya (also Romanized as Ālūchehlūy-e ‘Olyā; also known as Ālūchehlū-ye ‘Olyā) is a village in Ahmadabad Rural District, Takht-e Soleyman District, Takab County, West Azerbaijan Province, Iran. At the 2006 census, its population was 116, in 20 families.

References 

Populated places in Takab County